Harold Webster Gehman Jr. (born October 15, 1942) is a retired United States Navy four-star admiral who served as NATO's Supreme Allied Commander, Atlantic (SACLANT), Commander-in-Chief of the United States Joint Forces Command, one of the United States' Unified Combatant Commands, and Vice Chief of Naval Operations.  He was also the Co-Chairman of the Commission that investigated the terrorist attack on the USS Cole and was Chairman of the Columbia Accident Investigation Board (CAIB) after the Space Shuttle Columbia disintegrated during reentry in 2003, killing all seven crew members.

Military career

Gehman was born in Norfolk, Virginia on October 15, 1942, and graduated from Pennsylvania State University in 1965 with a Bachelor of Science in Industrial Engineering and a commission in the Navy from the Naval Reserve Officer Training Corps.

A Surface Warfare Officer, he served at all levels of leadership and command in guided missile destroyers and cruisers. During the course of his career, Gehman had five sea commands in ranks from Lieutenant to Rear Admiral.

Gehman served in Vietnam as Officer in Charge of a Swift patrol boat and later in Chu Lai as Officer in Charge of a detachment of six swift boats and their crews.

Gehman attended the Armed Forces Staff College from August 1975 to January 1976. He then commanded  from January 1976 to June 1978,  from December 1980 to September 1983,  from February 1988 to June 1989 and Cruiser-Destroyer Group 8 from July 1993 to July 1994.

His staff assignments were both afloat on a Carrier Battle Group staff and ashore on a fleet commander's staff, a Unified Commander's staff and in Washington, D.C. on the staff of the Chief of Naval Operations (four tours).

Promoted to four-star Admiral in 1996, he became the 29th Vice Chief of Naval Operations in September 1996. As Vice Chief of Naval Operations he was a member of the Joint Chiefs of Staff, formulated the Navy's $70 billion budget and developed and implemented policies governing the 375,000 people in the Navy.

Assigned in September 1997 as Supreme Allied Commander, Atlantic and Commander-in-Chief, United States Atlantic Command (later changed to Joint Forces Command), he became one of NATO's two military commanders and assumed command of all forces of all four services in the continental United States and became responsible for the provision of ready forces to the other Unified Commanders in Chief and for the development of new joint doctrine, training and requirements.

He retired from the Navy in October 2000.

Awards and decorations

Post military
In retirement, Gehman has served as chairman of the Columbia Accident Investigation Board, co-chair, with retired general William W. Crouch, of the Department of Defense's Cole Commission, on the Base Realignment and Closure (BRAC) committee, and is a Senior Fellow of the National Defense University's Capstone Program.

Personal
Gehman is married to Janet F. Johnson and they have two children, Katherine and Christopher.

References

External links

Gehman Bio (from US Naval Academy) 
Gehman Bio (from National Defense University)''

1942 births
Living people
Penn State College of Engineering alumni
Military personnel from Norfolk, Virginia
United States Navy personnel of the Vietnam War
Joint Forces Staff College alumni
Recipients of the Meritorious Service Medal (United States)
Recipients of the Legion of Merit
United States Navy admirals
Vice Chiefs of Naval Operations
Recipients of the Defense Distinguished Service Medal